This is a list of English words that may be of Etruscan origin, and were borrowed through Latin, often via French. The Etruscan origin of most of these words is disputed, and some may be of Indo-European or other origin. The question is made more complex by the fact that the Etruscans borrowed many Greek words in modified form. Typically if a Latin word has an unknown, uncertain or disputed origin, it is considered a possible candidate for deriving in whole or in part from an Etruscan word; however, native Etruscan must then be distinguished from Greek. If no Etruscan word is clearly identifiable sometimes an attempt is made to reconstruct one. Etruscan derivations therefore are highly variable in probability; that is, some are highly speculative and others more likely.

List
 ace  from Middle English aas, from Old French as, from Latin as, "a whole, a unit, copper coin", possibly Etruscan. As was a Roman coin and was also a unit of weight equal to about one troy pound.
 antenna  from antenna < antemna, "yard-arm, sail." Possibly Etruscan *antithemna > *ant(th)emna from Greek ἀνατιθέμενος anatithémenos, something set up.
 Anthony 
 April  Latin aprilis probably from Etruscan form apera- (found the Tabula Capuana, a ritual calendar line 8--the next section mentions May anpile), which form may come from Greek Aphrodite. There is also a gloss that equates Etruscan <c>Abreus with Latin Aprilis mensis.
 arena  from arēna "arena" < harēna, "arena, sand" < archaic hasēna < Sabine fasēna, unknown Etruscan word as the basis for fas- with Etruscan ending -ēna.
  atrium  From Latin atrium which both Breyer and Bonfante consider to be a likely loan from Etruscan (along with other architectural terms such as fenestra "window" and cella "chamber"). But both Watkins and de Vaan trace it back to Proto-Indo-European (though they disagree on the exact root).
 autumn  from autumnus "autumn." Just as Etruscan veltha, an earth god, appears as Latin Vola or Olta and is in Voltumna and Vertumnus, so the parallel construction autumnus ought to come from Etruscan autu-, related to avil, "year": *av(i)-to-m(e)nos, with loss of the l. There are some names with both l and t: avlethaium, authnal, avtle, and so on, which appear related to autu or auta in Venetic, the idea being that autumn signifies the passing of the year.
 belt  from balteus, "sword belt." The sole connection between this word and Etruscan is a statement by Marcus Terentius Varro that it was of Etruscan origin. All else is speculation.
 catamite  Latin, from Etruscan catmite, from the Ancient Greek Ganymede, cupbearer to Zeus. Bonfante and most others accept this etymology.
 ceremony  possibly Etruscan or possibly referring to Etruscan rites performed at Caere.
 defenestration, fenestra  Both Bonfante and Whatmough accept the probability that Latin fenestra was a loan from a derivative of Etruscan fnes-. Some of the other reasonably certain loans also deal with elements of architecture, for example atrium and cella.
 element  from elementum, 'letter'.
 histrionic  from histrionicus, from histrio, "actor".
 letter  from Old French lettre, from Latin littera, which may have derived, via Etruscan, from the Greek "διφθέρα" (writing tablet).
 mantissa 
 market 
 military  Etruscan or perhaps related to Greek homilos, "assembled crowd" (compare homily).
 mundane  from mundus, 'earth', from munth, 'land'.
 mutule 
 palace, palate, palatine  One of the seven hills of Rome.  Either from Latin palus "stake" or the Etruscan shepherd goddess Pales.
 people From Latin populus by way of Old French peuple, possibly of Etruscan origin. After a lengthy discussion, Whatmough concludes that it is not completely certain that Latin populus is an Etruscan loanword, but that such an etymology is "satisfactory at the morphological and phonological levels."
 person  from Middle English persone, from Old French persone, from Latin persona, "mask", probably from Etruscan phersu, "mask".
 Rome  from 'Ruma', the name of one of the Etruscan tribes, or 'Rumon', which was what the Etruscans called the Tiber River, possibly of Etruscan origin
satellite  from Latin satelles, meaning "bodyguard, attendant", perhaps from Etruscan satnal. Bonfante, otherwise quite skeptical of many proposed loans, calls it "quite likely" that Latin satteles is from Etruscan. Whatmough considers Latin satteles "as one of our securest Etruscan loans in Latin."
scurrilous 
 Serge (first name)
 serve  the word serve derives from Latin servire ('to serve') and servus ('a slave'), which have sometimes been thought to derive from Etruscan.<ref>E.g. Anna Kłosowska, 'The Etymology of 'Slave, in Disturbing Times: Medieval Pasts, Reimagined Futures, ed. by Catherine E. Karkov, Anna Kłosowska and Vincent W.J. van Gerven Oei (Earth, Milky Way: punctum, 2020), pp. 151-214 (p. 161).</ref> However, a detailed analysis has preferred an Indo-European etymology for the Latin word.
 spurious  From Latin spurius "born out of wedlock, illegitimate" from Etruscan spur-al "of the city" because, as Pisani proposed, children not claimed by their fathers were considered to belong to the city. Whatmough, however, rejects Pisani's claim, both because of the late attestation of the Latin term, but also because the Etruscan root spur is now seen as meaning "community" not "city"; and furthermore, in any case, the form that would have to be the immediate predecessor of Latin spurius would have to be Etruscan spurie which may have a different meaning, and in one instance seems to be the name of a person with a named father.
 triumph  From Old Latin triumpus, probably a loan word via Etruscan from Greek thriambos, a hymn to Dionysus.
 vernacular  from vernaculus, 'domestic', from verna, 'a native slave'.
 viburnum 

References

Bibliography
 
 Whatmough, M. Studies of Etruscan Loanwords in Latin PhD dissertation. University College London. 2007. https://discovery.ucl.ac.uk/id/eprint/10121058/1/Studies_in_the_Etruscan_loanwo.pdf
 Bonfante, G. "Etruscan Words in Latin" Word 36.3. 1985. pp. 203-210 https://www.tandfonline.com/doi/pdf/10.1080/00437956.1985.11435872?needAccess=true
 de Vaan, M. Etymological Dictionary of Latin and the other Italic Languages'' (Leiden Indo-European Etymological Dictionary Series, Volume: 7), 2011.

See also
Lists of English words of international origin

English
Etruscan

da:Danske ords etymologi